The 2018–19 season was the 115th in the history of Royal Charleroi Sporting Club and the club's seventh consecutive season in the top flight of Belgian football.

Players

First-team squad
Updated 31 January 2019.

On loan

Pre-season and friendlies

Competitions

Overall record

First Division A

League table

Results summary

Results by round

Matches

Europa League play-offs

Matches

Semi-final

Final

Belgian Cup

References

R. Charleroi S.C. seasons
Charleroi